Herbert Augustus Blaize PC (26 February 1918 – 19 December 1989) was a Grenadian politician and leader of the Grenada National Party. When Grenada was still a British Crown Colony he served as the first Chief Minister from 1960 to 1961, and again from 1962 to 1967. He became the first Premier of the autonomous Associated State of Grenada briefly in 1967. In the first elections following the 1983 coups and the American-led invasion of Grenada, he served as Prime Minister from 1984 until his death in 1989.

Early years
Blaize was born in the island of Carriacou, which along with the island of Petite Martinique is a part of Grenada. He moved to Aruba where he worked many years in the oil refinery of the Lago Oil and Transport Company.

Grenada National Party
In 1953 he formed the Grenada National Party as a rival party to the Grenada United Labour Party of Eric Gairy, who would be Blaize's main political rival for the next 25 years. Blaize entered the legislature in 1957 and became Minister of Trade and Production.

Chief Minister and Premier
He was appointed as Chief Minister in 1960 and held the additional portfolio of finance. He lost power to Gairy in 1961, and was reappointed in 1962 after Gairy was dismissed. In 1967 Grenada became an associated state within the British Empire, gaining more internal self-government.
He was the Leader of the Opposition in the House of Representatives of Grenada from 1974 to 1976.

In Opposition
In 1976 Blaize's center-right National Party joined forces with the left-wing New Jewel Movement led by Maurice Bishop for the elections that year, which Gairy and the GULP won. The alliance between Blaize and Bishop ended by 1979 when Bishop seized power. Blaize retired from politics and moved back to Carriacou, until after the intervention by the United States in 1983.

Prime Minister
During the election campaign of 1984, Blaize merged his parties with several other center-right parties to form the New National Party, which took 14 of 15 seats in the election.

In addition to being Prime Minister, Blaize became Minister of Home Affairs, Security, Information, Finance, Trade, Planning, Industrial Development and Carriacou and Petite Martinique Affairs.

Blaize's government advocated a strong economic and military alliance for Grenada with the United States, and other overseas investment.

Death
He died in December 1989 near St. George's, Grenada, following a several-years-long battle with prostate cancer, aged 71. Two days before his death, Blaize had been elected the first party leader of the newly formed National Party.

Family
Herbert Blaize was survived by his wife, 
Dame Venetia Blaize, DBE (née Venetia Ursula Davidson); three daughters, Norma Blaize (a former Consul-General of Grenada in New York), Carol Jerome and Marion Fleary; three sons, Samuel Blaize, Marvin Blaize and Christopher Blaize. He was also survived by a sister, Muriel Noel.

References

Sources
 LA GRENADE : mort du premier ministre., Le Monde. Jeudi 21 décembre 1989, p. 3; accessed October 7, 2006.

1918 births
1989 deaths
Deaths from prostate cancer
Prime Ministers of Grenada
Finance ministers of Grenada
Industry ministers of Grenada
Information ministers of Grenada
Interior ministers of Grenada
Members of the House of Representatives of Grenada
Members of the Privy Council of the United Kingdom
New National Party (Grenada) politicians
Carriacouan politicians
Grenada National Party politicians
The National Party politicians
Deaths from cancer in Grenada
20th-century Grenadian politicians